In mathematics,  a basis function is an element of a particular basis for a function space. Every function in the function space can be represented as a linear combination of basis functions, just as every vector in a vector space can be represented as a linear combination of basis vectors.

In numerical analysis and approximation theory, basis functions are also called blending functions, because of their use in interpolation: In this application, a mixture of the basis functions provides an interpolating function (with the "blend" depending on the evaluation of the basis functions at the data points).

Examples

Monomial basis for Cω
The monomial basis for the vector space of analytic functions is given by 

This basis is used in Taylor series, amongst others.

Monomial basis for polynomials
The monomial basis also forms a basis for the vector space of polynomials.

Fourier basis for L2[0,1]
Sines and cosines form an (orthonormal) Schauder basis for square-integrable functions on a bounded domain. As a particular example, the collection

forms a basis for L2[0,1].

See also

 Basis (linear algebra)  (Hamel basis)
 Schauder basis (in a Banach space)
 Dual basis
 Biorthogonal system (Markushevich basis)
 Orthonormal basis in an inner-product space
 Orthogonal polynomials
 Fourier analysis and Fourier series
 Harmonic analysis
 Orthogonal wavelet
 Biorthogonal wavelet
 Radial basis function 
 Finite-elements (bases)
 Functional analysis
 Approximation theory
 Numerical analysis

References

Numerical analysis
Fourier analysis
Linear algebra
Numerical linear algebra
Types of functions